Anti-communist films are typically political films that criticize the ideology of communism or communist governments, such as the Soviet Union. Many such films were created  in the United States, during the Cold War.

Anti-communist films
The following films have been interpreted by film critics or media sources as anti-communist films, or have been stated by their filmmakers as such.

References

Notes

See also
 List of anti-war films
 Anti-communism
 Criticism of communist party rule
 Criticism of Marxism

Anti-communism
Films about communism